USS Delegate (AM-217) was an  built for the United States Navy during World War II. She was awarded one battle star for service in the Pacific during World War II. She was decommissioned in May 1946 and turned over to the Republic of China. Named ROCS Yung Ho (PF-53) in the Republic of China Navy, she served until September 1962 when she was stricken. Her ultimate fate is not reported in secondary sources.

Career
Delegate was launched 28 March 1943 by Tampa Shipbuilding Co., Inc., Tampa, Florida; sponsored by Miss L. Bourget; and commissioned 30 April 1945.

Delegate sailed from Norfolk, Virginia, 14 July 1945 and called at Guantánamo Bay, San Pedro, Pearl Harbor, Eniwetok, and Saipan before arriving at Usuki Bay, Kyūshū, 3 November as escort for two LST's. She swept mines in Tsushima Straits from 15 to 22 December, then supervised Japanese minesweepers clearing the northern Futagami minefields from 20 to 26 January 1946. Delegate arrived at Kure 6 February to provide logistics support for the YMSs engaged in widening the swept channel to that port.

Delegate left Kure, Japan, 24 February 1946 and arrived at Subic Bay, Luzon, 5 March to have her armament removed. On 8 April she sailed for Shanghai, China, arriving 5 days later. She was decommissioned and turned over to the State Department 29 May 1946 for further transfer to the Republic of China, by which she was renamed and reclassified, ROCS Yung Ho (PF-53). She was decommissioned and struck from the Republic of China Navy on 1 September 1962; her ultimate fate is not reported in secondary sources.

Awards 
Delegate received one battle star for World War II service.

References

External links
 

Admirable-class minesweepers
Ships built in Tampa, Florida
1943 ships
World War II minesweepers of the United States
Admirable-class minesweepers of the Republic of China Navy